Integrity/Toronto is the oldest Canadian chapter of Integrity, a network of support and advocacy groups for gay and lesbian members of the Anglican Church of Canada, Episcopal Church (United States), Anglican Church of Australia, and Church of Uganda.

In 1975, Integrity/Chicago, the organization's first chapter, held a convention. The half-dozen attendees from Toronto discovered one another at the conference, and founded Integrity/Toronto.

The chapter has ties to the Church of the Redeemer, where its monthly services are held, and whose parish LGBT group overlaps heavily with Integrity/Toronto's membership.

Integrity/Toronto also holds annual retreats, operates a pamphlet ministry, appears at General Synod, and promotes parish education about GLBT Christian issues. It was engaged in a dialogue process with Fidelity before that group dissolved.

See also

LGBT-welcoming church programs

External links
Integrity/Toronto

Anglicanism
LGBT Christian organizations
LGBT organizations in Canada
LGBT culture in Toronto
Organizations based in Toronto
LGBT and Anglicanism